Valerie Askew (25 January 1939 – 27 August 2020) was a British modelling agent, and the co-founder (with her younger sister, Gloria) of the Askew Team modelling agency in 1966.

Early life
She was born in Epping, London on 25 January 1939, the daughter of William Askew, an opera singer turned music and drama teacher and Irene (née Molyneaux), a poet.

Career
In 1966, together with her younger sister Gloria, she founded the Askew Team modelling agency in 1966, at 22 Bruton Street, Mayfair, London. In 1973, they were the first London agency to open a branch in Milan.

Their models included Sue Nadkarni, Ika Hindley, Catherine Dyer, Lorraine Chase, Michael Edwards, Sadie Frost, and Naomi Campbell.

Personal life
In 1960, she married Joe Joseph, an RAF engineer. They had five children. They divorced in 1978.  She died of heart failure on 27 August 2020.

References

1939 births
2020 deaths
People from Epping
British models
British company founders